islaSol II formerly known as SaCaSol III is a 48-megawatt (MW) photovoltaic power station under construction developed by Bronzeoak Philippines for San Carlos Solar Energy Inc. (SaCaSol), located in Negros Occidental, Philippines.

islaSol II, follows SaCaSol I, the country's largest solar farm currently being expanded from 22 MW to 45 MW, and islaSol I, also being under construction with a planned final capacity of 32 megawatts.

References 

Photovoltaic power stations in the Philippines
Buildings and structures in Negros Occidental